Martin Pečar (born 5 July 2002) is a Slovenian footballer who plays as a midfielder for Austria Wien II.

Career
In early 2018, at the age of 15, Pečar trained with the senior team of Slovenian side Olimpija Ljubljana. Before the second half of 2021–22, he was sent on loan to Austria Wien II in the Austrian second tier from German Bundesliga club Eintracht Frankfurt. On 18 February 2022, he debuted for Austria Wien II during a 2–0 defeat against Floridsdorfer AC. On 1 July 2022, the transfer to Austria was made permanent.

References

External links

 

2002 births
Living people
People from Izola
Slovenian footballers
Slovenia youth international footballers
Slovenia under-21 international footballers
Association football midfielders
Eintracht Frankfurt players
FK Austria Wien players
2. Liga (Austria) players
Slovenian expatriate footballers
Expatriate footballers in Germany
Expatriate footballers in Austria
Slovenian expatriate sportspeople in Germany
Slovenian expatriate sportspeople in Austria